Acanthosaura brachypoda is a species of agama found in Vietnam.

References

brachypoda
Reptiles of Vietnam
Reptiles described in 2011
Taxa named by Natalia B. Ananjeva
Taxa named by Nikolai Loutseranovitch Orlov